Liloan, officially the Municipality of Liloan,  is a 1st class municipality in the province of Cebu, Philippines. According to the 2020 census, it has a population of 153,197 people. Liloan lies within Metro Cebu.

Liloan is bordered on the north by the town of Compostela, to the west by Cebu City, on the east by the Camotes Sea, and on the south by the town of Consolacion.

History

Along its coastline, there is a spot called Silot, where a whirlpool is created by the ebbs and flows of the waters from the bay. This phenomenon is called lilo in Cebuano. Because of this, the town was known as Liloan, meaning "a place where there is a lilo".

Sometime in the 1970s, a newspaper article stated that the "pueblo de Liloan" was separated from the municipality of Mandaue (now Mandaue City), and was created a new municipality in 1840. However, in his "Breve reseña de lo que fue y de lo que es la Diócesis de Cebú en las Islas Filipinas,"  states that Lilo a was created as a parish in 1845 (in 1995, Lilo a celebrated its sesquicentennial - 150th – anniversary.)

The creation of the municipality of Liloan could have been at the same time the parish was established, but not earlier than its being a parish. As recorded, the first priest of Lilo served in 1845. The term of the first mayor was from 1845 to 1846.

During the war years (World War II), Lilo had three mayors at one time.

Cityhood

House Bill No. 5031 was filed last October 2, 2019, for the conversion of the municipality of Liloan into a component city in the province of Cebu. The bill is currently pending with the committee on local government since November 4, 2019. The Philippine Statistics Authority (PSA) highlights Liloan to quality for cityhood under the population requirement of the local government code.

On June 30, 2022, House Bill No. 99 by Rep. Vincent Franco Frasco which seeks to convert the municipality of Liloan into a component city to be known as the City of Liloan.

Geography

Barangays
Liloan comprises 14 barangays:

Climate

Demographics

Economy

Landmarks

Lighthouse

One of the best known landmarks in Liloan is its historic lighthouse at Bagacay Point. The original lighthouse was built in 1857 by the Spanish. The current tower was constructed in 1904 by order of William Howard Taft, the first Governor-General of the Philippines and later the President of the United States. The lighthouse was declared a National Historical Landmark in 2004 by the National Historical Commission of the Philippines (formerly known as National Historical Institute).

Liloan Church (San Fernando Rey Parish Church)

The designer of the church in Liloan is viewed by some as visionary. Despite Liloan having only 5,000 citizens, when the church was constructed in 1847, this local church was even larger than that of Mandaue, Cebu's second largest city.

Titay's Rosquillos and Delicacies

The making of these little ringlet cookies dates back to 1907, when 21-year-old Margarita "Titay" (single, unmarried) was tinkering in her kitchen with her baking ingredients and made her new culinary creation. Kneading the dough manually and using a wooden eggbeater, some baking tins and a clay oven, she started a product that would put her little town in the national and international map of gastronomic delight.

The market for her unnamed cookie started with her neighbors and passers-by who were offered the snack with a bottle of soda. It was Sergio Osmeña (then Cebu governor, who later became Philippine president), who gave it the name "rosquillos" after the Spanish word rosca.

The biscuits have been a regular stopover of tourists and locals travelling north of Cebu. The company has withstood the taste of time. It started with just rosquillos and tablea making. It later expanded to an array of homemade delicacies including torta, mamon, monay, otap, CPA (chicken pork adobo), bao-bao and more.

Tourism

Rosquillos Festival
Celebrated every last week of May in honor of the town's patron saint, St. Ferdinand III. It celebrates the Rosquillos as the delicacy of Liloan and of Cebu.

List of heads of local government

 Basilio Bantilan (1845 - 1846)
 Hipolito Pepito (1846 - 1847)
 Francisco Cabahug (1847 - 1848 and 1859 - 1860)
 Esteban Cañete (1848 - 1849, 1850 - 1851 and 1852 - 1853)
 Juan Delgado (1849 - 1850)
 Juan Cabatingan (1851 - 1852 and 1861 - 1862)
 Cruz Mendoza (1853 - 1855 and 1860 - 1861)
 Alberto Yungco (1855 - 1857)
 Victor Pepito (1857 - 1858, 1863 - 1865 and 1875 - 1879)
 Pedro Pepito (1858 - 1859 and 1862 - 1863)
 Felix Cabatingan (1865 - 1867)
 Jacinto Cañete (1867 - 1869)
 Apolonio Pilapil (1869 - 1871)
 Custodio Mendoza (1871 - 1873, 1883 - 1885 and 1899 - 1900)
 Guillermo Pepito (1873 - 1875)
 Ambrosio Pepito (1879 - 1881)
 Eugenio Pilapil (1881 - 1883 and 1889 - 1891)
 Mamerto Cabatingan (1883 - 1887 and 1891 - 1893)
 Sotero Cabatingan (1887 - 1889, 1900 - 1902 and 1905 - 1909)
 Antonio Villamor (1893 - 1896)
 Simeon Pilapil (1896 - 1898)
 Mariano Pilapil (1898 - 1899)
 Blas Cabatingan (1902 - 1904)
 Marcelo Pilapil (1909 - 1911)
 Francisco Ramas (1911 - 1912)
 Jose Cabatingan (1912 - 1916)
 Cirilo Ramas (1916 - 1919)
 Cipiriano Jumapao (1919 - 1922)
 Florintino Pilapil (1922 - 1925)
 Santiago Noval (1925 - 1928)
 Lazaro Ramas (1928 - 1937, 1937 - 1938, 1959 - 1963 and 1963 - 1965)
 Catalino Noval (1941 - 1945, 1945 - 1946 and 1965 - 1967)
 Jorge Pitogo (1946 - 1947 and 1947 - 1951)
 Fabian Cañete (1951 - 1955)
 Teofilo Ponce (1967 - 1971)
 Cesar Bugtai (1971 - 1986)
 Achilles Cañete (1986 - 1988 and 1988 - 1992)
 Panphil Frasco (1992 - 1995, 1995 - 1998 and 1998 - 2001)
 Maria Sevilla (2001 - 2004 and 2004 - 2007)
 Duke Frasco (2007 - 2016)
 Christina Garcia-Frasco (2016 – 2022)

Gallery

See also
Liloan, Southern Leyte - a municipality in Southern Leyte
Liloan - a barangay in Santander, Cebu

Notes

References

Sources

External links
 [ Philippine Standard Geographic Code]

Municipalities of Cebu
Municipalities in Metro Cebu